The laryngeal ventricle, (also called the ventricle of the larynx, laryngeal sinus, or Morgagni's sinus) is a fusiform fossa, situated between the vestibular and vocal folds on either side, and extending nearly their entire length. There is also a sinus of Morgagni in the pharynx.

The fossa is bounded, above, by the free crescentic edge of the vestibular ligament; below, by the straight margin of the vocal fold and laterally, by the mucous membrane covering the corresponding thyroarytenoid muscle.

The anterior part of the ventricle leads up by a narrow opening into a pouch-like diverticulum, a mucous membranous sac of variable size called the appendix of the laryngeal ventricle. The appendix (also called  the laryngeal saccule, pouch or Hilton's pouch) extends vertically from the laryngeal ventricle. It runs between the vestibular fold, thyroarytenoid muscle, and thyroid cartilage, and is conical, bending slightly backward. It is covered in roughly seventy mucous glands. The muscles surrounding the appendix compress it until mucus is secreted to lubricate the vocal folds.

Additional images

References

External links
 
 

Human throat